Hannah Green may refer to:

 Hannah Green (author) (1927–1996), American author
 Hannah Green (golfer), Australian golfer
 Hannah Green, pen name for American author Joanne Greenberg (born 1932)
 Dr. Hannah Green, fictional protagonist of the Hannah Green book series by Adrian Praetzellis